The Rainbow is a 1929 American pre-Code Western film directed by Reginald Barker and starring Dorothy Sebastian, Lawrence Gray and Sam Hardy.

Cast
 Dorothy Sebastian as Lola 
 Lawrence Gray as Jim Forbes 
 Sam Hardy as Derbyy Scanlon 
 Harvey Clark as Baldy 
 Paul Hurst as Pat 
 Gino Corrado as Slug 
 King Zany as Dummy

References

Bibliography
 Pitts, Michael R. Poverty Row Studios, 1929–1940: An Illustrated History of 55 Independent Film Companies, with a Filmography for Each. McFarland & Company, 2005.

External links
 

1929 films
1929 Western (genre) films
American Western (genre) films
American black-and-white films
1920s English-language films
Films directed by Reginald Barker
Tiffany Pictures films
Transitional sound Western (genre) films
1920s American films